is a Nintendo Entertainment System video game released in the US in 1988 by Toho Co., Ltd. The North American version removes all references to Toho Cenfile-Soft Library and Compile, crediting the game to Toho Eizo on the title screen instead.

Storyline
In the year 2XXX, the mysterious Planet X appears when Pluto and Neptune switch positions in the solar system, and its inhabitants begin an attempt to conquer the Earth, using a legion of space monsters (though some of these creatures were in fact from Earth) as their primary attack force. The King of Monsters, Godzilla, joins forces with the guardian monster Mothra and the forces of Earth to repel the invasion forces.

Gameplay

The game features two playable characters, Godzilla and Mothra (who originally appeared in her own movie and then later became a regular monster to fight alongside Godzilla). The player uses both monsters in turn by selecting the desired character on a virtual gameboard, representative of the planet it is on, and moving it like a chess piece. Each space is a hexagon that represents playable, side-scrolling levels. There are rocky zones, jungle zones, city zones, and hyperspace zones. The hyperspace zones feature fights with the Matango, Dogora, and the Goten. The alien space ships resemble the design of Atragon and The War in Space.

Each board contains several monsters from the Godzilla series and some from other Toho movies and the objective is to clear each board of enemy monsters before advancing to the next board. Battles are fought when the player moves Godzilla or Mothra adjacent to an enemy monster, and are reminiscent of a match from a fighting game. The player plays a small side-scrolling level for each space advanced, and if one has moved adjacent to the monster, a battle follows the side-scrolling stages. More monsters appear on each stage until nearly every monster in the game is featured. When the player reaches Planet X, every previous monster is present along with King Ghidorah himself. The monster battles have a time limit of forty seconds but lack a countdown timer.

The monsters from the game (in order of confrontation and with their corresponding planets):

Earth: Gezora - A giant squid or cuttlefish-like creature (originally from the 1970 movie Space Amoeba)
Earth: Moguera - A giant robot (originally from the 1957 movie The Mysterians)
Mars: Varan - A giant gliding lizard (originally from the 1958 movie Varan the Unbelievable)
Jupiter: Hedorah - A giant alien creature that feeds off of pollution (from the 1971 Godzilla movie Godzilla vs. Hedorah)
Saturn: Baragon - A fire-breathing dinosaur (originally from the 1965 movie Frankenstein Conquers the World)
Uranus: Gigan - A cyborg monster with blade arms (from the 1972 Godzilla movie Godzilla vs. Gigan)
Pluto: Mechagodzilla - A robotic replica of Godzilla (from the 1974 Godzilla movie Godzilla vs. Mechagodzilla)
Planet X: King Ghidorah - A giant three-headed dragon (from the 1964 Godzilla movie Ghidorah, the Three-Headed Monster)

The titular mushroom kaiju from the 1963 film Matango appear as mid-bosses throughout the early stages of the game. In later stages, that role goes to Gohten, the space battleship from the 1977 sci-fi film The War in Space.

In addition, Dogora from the 1964 film of the same name and the creature Manda from the 1963 film Atragon appear as common enemies throughout the game.

Sequels
Later, a sequel was made called Godzilla 2: War of the Monsters. The player controls the Army, trying to protect Japan from the Godzilla characters.

In popular culture
This game was the focus on a popular creepypasta titled "NES Godzilla Creepypasta", where a fan of the game ends up playing a twisted version of the game possessed by a vicious demonic entity called Red, a skeletal red monster who heavily distorts the game to hellish and unrealistic depths and has a history with the narrator's late girlfriend. The story is notable for also featuring a heavy amount of "screenshots" from the fictional version of the game. A fangame is currently being developed with a demo being released in 2017.

References

External links
 
 Godzilla: Monster of Monsters at SuperFamicom.org

1988 video games
Godzilla games
Nintendo Entertainment System games
Nintendo Entertainment System-only games
Science fiction video games
Side-scrolling video games
Video games developed in Japan
Video games with isometric graphics
Single-player video games
Compile (company) games
Toho